Wholey is a surname. Notable people with the surname include:

Dennis Wholey (born 1939), American television host, producer, and writer
Jake Wholey (born 1993), English footballer

See also
Whaley (surname)
Wholey's, a retail company in Pittsburgh, Pennsylvania, United States